Øyvind Rimbereid (born 2 May 1966 in Stavanger) is a Norwegian author and composer of lyric poetry. He has worked as an instructor at Skrivekunstakademiet in Bergen. Rimbereid holds a cand. philol. degree from the University of Bergen with high marks in Nordic languages and literature. He won the Brage Prize 2008 for his poetry collection Herbarium.

Bibliography 
Det har begynt – stories (1993) 
Som solen vokser – novel (1996)
Kommende år – stories (1998)
Seine topografiar – poetry (2001)
Trådreiser – poetry (2001)
Solaris korrigert – poetry (2004)
Hvorfor ensomt leve, essays (2006)
Herbarium, poetry (2008)
Jimmen, poetry (2011)
Orgelsjøen, poetry (2013)
Lovene, poetry (2015)
Lenis plassar. Et dikt, poetry (2017)

Prizes 
Sult-prisen 2001
Den norske Lyrikklubbens pris 2002
The Norwegian Critics Prize for Literature (Kritikerprisen) 2004, for Solaris korrigert
The Brage Prize 2008, for Herbarium
Shortlisted for Nordic Council's Literature Prize 2009, for Herbarium
The Norwegian Critics Prize for Literature (Kritikerprisen) 2013, for Orgelsjøen
Aschehougprisen 2017

References 

1966 births
Living people
20th-century Norwegian novelists
21st-century Norwegian novelists
21st-century Norwegian poets
Norwegian male poets
University of Bergen alumni
Norwegian Critics Prize for Literature winners
People from Stavanger
Norwegian male novelists
20th-century Norwegian male writers
21st-century Norwegian male writers